Jean Thouma Hannah Succar Kuri (born September 19, 1944, in Bsharri, Lebanon) is a Lebanese-born Mexican businessman convicted of child pornography and child sexual abuse in Cancún, Quintana Roo. 
He was sentenced to 112 years in prison on August 31, 2011.

On August 19, 1975, Succar arrived in the state of Guanajuato with relatives of his, and then relocated to Cancún, which was seeing an explosion in the tourist industry. He then married, divorced, and remarried an 18-year-old woman, the mother of his five children. He saw his empire grow from a soda stand to a group of four villas, 70 hotel rooms, and one hotel. His fortune was estimated to be 30 million dollars.

After the publication of the expose Los Demonios del Edén (Demons of Eden) by Lydia Cacho, he was associated with Puebla-based Lebanese businessman Kamel Nacif Borge in a sexual exploitation ring. In 2004 he was detained in Chandler, Arizona, and extradited to Mexico by a request of the attorney general and Interpol. He was accused of child pornography, child sexual abuse and statutory rape. and was finally sentenced to 112 years in prison on charges of child pornography and corruption of minors. According to Mexican law, he would have to serve minimum 60 years of that sentence.

References

1944 births
Lebanese businesspeople
Lebanese emigrants to Mexico
Lebanese people imprisoned abroad
Mexican businesspeople
Mexican people of Lebanese descent
People from Cancún
People from Bsharri
People extradited to Mexico
Living people
People extradited from the United States